SS Cassimir was a Design 1022 cargo ship built for the United States Shipping Board immediately after World War I.

History
She was laid down at yard number 1531 at the Philadelphia, Pennsylvania shipyard of the American International Shipbuilding Corporation, one of 110 Design 1022 cargo ships built for the United States Shipping Board. She was completed in 1920 and named Cassimir. In 1920, she was purchased by the American Fuel & Transportation Company and converted into a tanker by the Globe Shipbuilding Company in Baltimore with a 344,963 gallon capacity. In 1921, she was returned to the USSB. In 1922, she was purchased by the Curtis Bay Copper & Iron Works (Baltimore, Maryland). In 1923, she was purchased by the Cuban Distilling Company  where she was utilized to transport blackstrap molasses, a byproduct of sugar refining, to the United States where it would be used to produce cattle feed, vinegar and denatured alcohol.

On February 26, 1942, she collided with the U.S. freighter SS Lara and sank southeast of Wilmington, North Carolina.

References

Bibliography

External links
 EFC Design 1022: Illustrations

1920 ships
Ships built in Philadelphia
Merchant ships of the United States
Maritime incidents in February 1942
Design 1022 ships
Tankers of the United States